Dilocerus is a genus of beetles in the family Cerambycidae, containing the species Dilocerus brunneus (Napp and Martins, 2006) and Dilocerus marinonii (Napp, 1980).

References

Compsocerini